Dagmar Andres (born 3 December 1969) is a German accountant and politician of the Social Democratic Party (SPD) who has been serving as a Member of the Bundestag since 2021, representing the Euskirchen – Rhein-Erft-Kreis II district. She previously worked as advisor on European affairs at NRW.Bank.

Political career

Career in state politics 
Andres joined the SPD in 1986. From 2012 until 2017, she was a member of the State Parliament of North Rhine-Westphalia, where she served on the Finance Committee, the Budget Committee and the Audit Committee.

Member of the German Parliament, 2021–present 
In parliament, Andres has been serving on the Finance Committee and the Committee on European Affairs since 2021.

In addition to her committee assignments, Andres has been part of the German delegation to the Parliamentary Assembly of the Organization for Security and Co-operation in Europe since 2022.

References 

1969 births
Living people
Female members of the Bundestag
21st-century German politicians
21st-century German women politicians
Members of the Bundestag 2021–2025
Members of the Bundestag for the Social Democratic Party of Germany
Members of the Bundestag for North Rhine-Westphalia
Members of the Landtag of North Rhine-Westphalia